The following is a list of notable straw polls for the 2016 Republican Party's presidential nomination.

Conservative Political Action Conference

CPAC 2013

CPAC 2014

CPAC 2015

CPAC 2016

Values Voter Summit

VVS 2013

VVS 2014

VVS 2015

Southern Republican Leadership Conference

SRLC 2014

SRLC 2015
The poll was held at the conference May 23, 2015, in Oklahoma City.

Western Conservative Summit

WCS 2014

WCS 2015

February 25, 2015 - Washington State Republican Party Straw Poll

February 25, 2015 - National Republican Trust Political Action Committee Straw Poll

March 14, 2015 - Georgia Association of Republican County Chairmen Straw Poll
The GA-ARCC straw poll was held in over 30 counties as part of Republican county conventions in Georgia:

June 27, 2015 - Citizens United Straw Poll

July 20, 2015 - Washington, D.C. Republican Party Straw Poll

September 20, 2015 - Michigan Republican Party Straw Poll

October 8–18, 2015 - Georgia National Fair "Peanut Poll" Straw Poll

October 19, 2015 - North Carolina Tea Party Caucus

References

Opinion polling for the 2016 United States presidential election
2016 United States Republican presidential primaries